Paracingulina triarata is a species of sea snail, a marine gastropod mollusk in the family Pyramidellidae, the pyrams and their allies.

Distribution
This species occurs in the Pacific Ocean off Japan.

References

Pyramidellidae
Gastropods described in 1904